Bartel Hilen Reinheimer (April 6, 1889 – November 12, 1949) was second bishop of the Episcopal Diocese of Rochester, serving from 1938 to 1949.

Early life and education
Reinheimer was born on April 6, 1889, in Sandusky, Ohio, the son of Alfred Reinheimer and Beatrice Savanack. He studied at Kenyon College, from where he graduated with a Bachelor of Science in 1911. The same college also awarded him a Doctor of Divinity in 1931. He studied at Bexley Hall from were he graduated with a Bachelor of Divinity in 1914. He was awarded a Doctor of Laws by Hobart College in 1936.

Ordination
Reinheimer was ordained deacon in 1914 and priest in 1915. He served as deacon and later priest-in-charge at St Mark's Church in Shelby, Ohio, between 1914 and 1916. Later he became curate of Christ Church in Dayton, Ohio and in 1918 rector of the same church where he remained till 1921. He served as Executive secretary and Archdeacon of Southern Ohio between 1921 and 1931. In 1931 he became the National secretary of the Field Department of the Episcopal Church.

Bishop
Reinheimer was elected Coadjutor Bishop of Rochester in 1936 and was consecrated on March 4, 1936, by Presiding Bishop James De Wolf Perry. In 1938 he succeeded as Bishop of Rochester. During his bishopric he also served as trustee and honorary chancellor of the Colleges of the Seneca. He was also president of the Province of New York and New Jersey in Episcopal Church between 1947 and 1949. He was also a trustee of the University of Rochester. Reinheimer died in office on November 12, 1949.

Family
Reinheimer married Helen Marie Smith on August 31, 1914, and together had 2 sons.

References

1889 births
1949 deaths
People from Sandusky, Ohio
Kenyon College alumni
20th-century American Episcopalians
Episcopal bishops of Rochester